Dmitriyev or Dmitriev is a common Russian surname that is derived from the male given name Dmitry and literally means Dmitry's. It may refer to:
Aleksandr Dmitriyev (conductor) (born 1935), Russian conductor
Alexey Dmitriev (b. 1985), Russian ice hockey player
Andrei Dmitriev (b. 1979), Russian political dissident, publicist.
Andrei Dmitriev (b. 1956), Russian writer
Artur Dmitriev (b. 1968), Russian Olympic champion in figure skating
Dmitri Dmitrijev (b. 1982), Estonian politician
Dmitriy Dmitriyev (b. 1983), Russian professional football player
Georgy Dmitriyev (1942–2016), a Russian composer
Igor Dmitriev (1927–2008), Russian actor
Ivan Dmitriev (1760–1837), Russian poet
Matvey Dmitriev-Mamonov (1790–1863), Russian poet, public and military figure
Maxim Dmitriyev (1913–1990), Soviet army officer and Hero of the Soviet Union
Mikhail Gennadiyevich Dmitriyev (b. 1947), Soviet and Russian mathematician
Nikolai Dmitriev (1898–1954), Soviet linguist
V. Dmitriev, soloist with the Alexandrov Ensemble
Vladimir Dmitriyev (1900–1948), Soviet theater designer and painter
Vladimir Karpovich Dmitriev (1868–1913), Russian economist, mathematician and statistician
Yury Dmitriyev (1911–2006), Soviet theater and art critic
Yury Dmitriyev (b. 1946), Soviet cyclist
Yury A. Dmitriev (b. 1956), rights activist and Gulag historian

Russian-language surnames
Patronymic surnames
Surnames from given names